John DeFrancis (August 31, 1911January 2, 2009) was an American linguist, sinologist, author of Chinese language textbooks, lexicographer of Chinese dictionaries, and Professor Emeritus of Chinese Studies at the University of Hawaii at Mānoa.

Early life
John DeFrancis was born in Bridgeport, Connecticut in a family of modest Italian immigrant origins. His father, a laborer (who changed his name from DeFrancesco), died when DeFrancis was a young child. His mother was illiterate.

Professional life 
After graduating from Yale University in 1933 with a BA in economics, DeFrancis sailed to China with the intent of studying Chinese and working in business. In 1935, he accompanied H. Desmond Martin, a Canadian military historian, on a several-thousand-mile trip retracing the route of Genghis Khan through Mongolia and northwestern China. His book In the Footsteps of Genghis Khan (University of Hawai'i Press, 1993) describes this journey riding camels across the Gobi Desert, visiting the ruins of Khara-Khoto and rafting down the Yellow River. Along the way, he met the Chinese Muslim Ma Clique warlords Ma Buqing and Ma Bukang. DeFrancis returned to the United States in 1936 and did not visit China again until 1982.

DeFrancis began graduate studies in Chinese, first at Yale under George A. Kennedy and then at Columbia University due to Columbia's larger graduate program in Sinology. He received an MA from Columbia in 1941, then a PhD in 1948 with a dissertation entitled "Nationalism and Language Reform in China", which was published by Princeton University Press in 1950. He began his academic career teaching Chinese at Johns Hopkins University during the period of McCarthyism and the Red Scare, but was blacklisted for defending his colleague Owen Lattimore from unsubstantiated allegations of being a "Russian spy", and eventually laid off in 1954.

After an unhappy stint as a vacuum-cleaner salesman, DeFrancis eventually returned to teaching, notably at Seton Hall University from 1961 to 1966, and the University of Hawai'i at Mānoa from 1966 to 1976. In the 1960s, at the request of John B. Tsu, he wrote a 12-volume series of Mandarin Chinese textbooks and readers published by Yale University Press (popularly known as the "DeFrancis series"), which were widely used in Chinese as a foreign language classes for decades; DeFrancis was one of the first educators outside China to use pinyin as an educational aid, and his textbooks are said to have had a "tremendous impact" on Chinese teaching in the West. He served as Associate Editor of the Journal of the American Oriental Society from 1950 to 1955 and the Journal of the Chinese Language Teachers Association from 1966 to 1978.

Retirement 
DeFrancis retired from teaching in 1976, but remained an important figure in Chinese language pedagogy, Asian sociolinguistics, and language policy, as well as a prolific author. One of his most well-known books, The Chinese Language: Fact and Fantasy (University of Hawai'i Press, 1984) attempts to debunk a number of what DeFrancis considered "widespread myths" about the language—including, for instance, what he referred to as "The Ideographic Myth." Another influential work of his was Visible Speech: The Diverse Oneness of Writing Systems (Honolulu: University of Hawai'i Press, 1989), which addressed more myths about the Chinese writing system, and has been called his "magnum opus" by colleague Victor H. Mair.  DeFrancis spent his final years diligently working as Editor in Chief of the "ABC (Alphabetically Based Computerized) series" of Chinese dictionaries, which feature innovative collation by the pinyin romanization system.

Around the 2009 New Year, celebrating Christmas at an Honolulu Chinese restaurant, DeFrancis choked on a piece of Beijing duck. He died on 2 January 2009, in Honolulu, Hawaii, at the age of 97.

Works

John DeFrancis was the author and editor of numerous publications. See Mair 1991 (pages vii-ix) for a partial list.

The "DeFrancis series"
Textbooks (Yale Language Series, Yale University Press):
Beginning Chinese (1963). 2nd revised edition, 1976. .
Character Text for Beginning Chinese (1964). 2nd edition, 1976. .
Beginning Chinese Reader (Parts I and II) (1966) .
Intermediate Chinese (1964) .
Character Text for Intermediate Chinese (1965) .
Intermediate Chinese Reader (Parts I and II) (1967) Part 1: . Part 2: .
Advanced Chinese (1966) .
Character Text for Advanced Chinese (1966) .
Advanced Chinese Reader (1968) .
Index Volume (1968)
Annotated Quotations from Chairman Mao (1975) .

Supplementary series
Accompanying Supplementary Readers for the Intermediate Chinese Reader, (Yale University Press, 1976):
 Volume I: The White Haired Girl by Chi-Yu Ho. .
 Volume II: The Red Detachment of Women by Chi-Yu Ho. .
 Volume III: Episodes From the Dream of the Red Chamber by Louise H. Li. .
 Volume IV: Sun Yat-sen by Yung Teng Chia-Yee. .
 Volume V: Wu Song Kills a Tiger by Yung Teng Chia-Yee. .

Books and monographs
"The Prospects for Chinese Writing Reform", Sino-Platonic Papers No. 171, 2006
In the Footsteps of Genghis Khan (University of Hawaii Press, 1993) , .
Visible Speech: The Diverse Oneness of Writing Systems (University of Hawaii Press, 1989) .
The Chinese Language: Fact and Fantasy (University of Hawaii Press, 1984) .
Colonialism and Language Policy in Vietnam (Contributions to the Sociology of Language, Nr. 19, Mouton, 1977) .
Things Japanese in Hawaii (University of Hawaii Press, 1973) .
Chinese-English Glossary of the Mathematical Sciences (American Mathematical Society, 1964)
Chinese Social History, by E-tu Zen and John DeFrancis (American Council of Learned Societies, 1956)
Bibliography on Chinese Social History, by E-tu Zen and John DeFrancis (Yale University, Far Eastern Publications, 1952)
Talks on Chinese History (with Elizabeth Jen Young) (Far Eastern Publications, 1952)
Report of the Second Round Table Meeting on Linguistics, Language Teaching Monograph Series on Languages and Linguistics, No. 1 (Georgetown University Press, 1951)
Nationalism and Language Reform in China (Princeton University Press, 1950; reprinted Octagon Books, 1975) .
Chinese Agent in Mongolia, translated from the Chinese of Ma Ho-t'ien (Johns Hopkins Press, 1949)

Dictionaries
Editor of bilingual Chinese dictionaries (University of Hawai'i Press), which are used as databases for software such as Wenlin:
ABC Chinese-English Dictionary (1996, pocket edition 1999) .
ABC Chinese-English Comprehensive Dictionary (2003) .
ABC Chinese-English/English-Chinese Dictionary (2010)

Reviews

References

Works cited

Further reading
Mair, Victor H., ed. Schriftfestschrift: Essays on Writing and Language in Honor of John DeFrancis on His Eightieth Birthday, Sino-Platonic Papers #27, August 1991. (PDF)

External links

 John DeFrancis biography, Wenlin Institute
 Contents and excerpt from The Chinese Language: Fact and Fantasy, Pinyin.info
 John DeFrancis page, University of Hawai'i at Manoa
 John DeFrancis' acceptance speech for the Walton Lifetime Achievement Award of the Chinese Language Teachers Association in 1998.
 John DeFrancis Memorial 1911-2009
 Andrew Leonard: A name China scholars will remember Salon, Jan. 8, 2009.
 Remembering John DeFrancis The China Beat (blog). 1/21/2009.

American sinologists
1911 births
2009 deaths
20th-century linguists
Linguists from the United States
People from Bridgeport, Connecticut
University of Hawaiʻi faculty
Columbia Graduate School of Arts and Sciences alumni